Endoclita viridis is a species of moth of the family Hepialidae first described by Charles Swinhoe in 1892. It is known from India.

References

External links
"Endoclita Felder, 1874". Buffalo Museum of Science. Archived May 12, 2006.

Moths described in 1892
Hepialidae